Mayflower is the name of many ships. Notable ones include:

  was the ship that transported the Pilgrims from Plymouth to the New World (America) in 1620
 Mayflower, a second ship of the same name that made the voyage several times including as part of the Winthrop Fleet in 1630
 , a replica of the Mayflower that transported the Pilgrims from Plymouth in 1620, built in Devon, England, during 1955–1956
 , a steam tug of 1861, preserved at Bristol in the United Kingdom
  , an 1886 America's Cup yacht
 Mayflower, a man-o-war of the English navy which sank on the Seven Stones Reef in March 1656
 Mayflower, a paddle steamer carrying passengers between New Orleans and St. Louis, in the mid-nineteenth century
 , a wooden-hulled scow schooner that sank in 1891. The shipwreck site is on the National Register of Historic Places
 , a flat-bottom steamer that sank on Kamaniskeg Lake in 1912
 , a World War II corvette of the Royal Canadian Navy
 *Mayflower AI sea drone, an autonomous research vessel planned to cross the Atlantic without human assistance in 2021 to retrace the original Mayflowers route
 Mayflower of Liberia, which sailed from New York in 1820 to found Liberia
 , more than one United States Coast Guard ship
 , a lighthouse tender in the United States Lighthouse Service
 , more than one United States Navy ship

See also
 Harwich Mayflower Heritage Centre, a museum with a full-scale replica of the 1620 Mayflower
 Mayflower (disambiguation)

References

Ship names